The Masonic Temple — Newport Lodge No. 445 F. & A.M. is a historic building located in Newport in Herkimer County, New York.  Built in 1903 as a meeting hall for a local Masonic Lodge, the building is a -story, five-bay-wide by three-bay-deep wood-frame building, with a rectangular main block and square shaped rear wing.  It features a two tiered, semi-circular entry porch.  The interior features Colonial Revival style detailing.

It was listed on the National Register of Historic Places in 2010.

References

Clubhouses on the National Register of Historic Places in New York (state)
Masonic buildings in New York (state)
Masonic buildings completed in 1903
Colonial Revival architecture in New York (state)
Buildings and structures in Herkimer County, New York
National Register of Historic Places in Herkimer County, New York